Robert Fitzgerald (1910–1985) was an American classicist and translator of ancient Greek and Latin

Robert Fitzgerald may also refer to:

Robert FitzGerald (1637–1698), Irish MP for Kildare County
Robert FitzGerald (1654–1718), Irish MP for Castlemartyr and Youghal
Robert FitzGerald (1671–1725), Irish MP for Charleville
Robert FitzGerald, 19th Earl of Kildare (1675–1743), Irish peer
Robert FitzGerald, 17th Knight of Kerry (1717–1781), Irish MP for Dingle
Lord Robert Stephen FitzGerald (1765–1833), 6th son of James FitzGerald, 1st Duke of Leinster, and British diplomat in Switzerland 1792–1795
Robert Uniacke Fitzgerald (1771–1842), Irish MP for Cork County, 1797
Robert Lewis Fitzgerald (1776–1844), Royal Navy officer
Robert Fitzgerald (pastoralist) (1807–1865), Australian pastoralist and politician
Robert D. FitzGerald (1830–1892), Irish-Australian botanist and surveyor
R. D. Fitzgerald (1902–1987), Australian poet and grandson of the above botanist/surveyor
Robert Allan Fitzgerald (1834–1881), English cricketer
Robert Fitzgerald (Australian politician) (1846–1933), New South Wales parliamentarian
Robert Fitzgerald (speed skater) (1923–2005), American speed skater
Bob Fitzgerald (basketball) (1923–1983), American basketball player
Bob Fitzgerald (born 1968), sports commentator

See also
Robert Fitzgerald Prosody Award, an award given to scholars who have made a lasting contribution to the art and science of versification